Dodeuramsan  is a mountain in Gyeonggi-do, South Korea. It is within the boundaries of the city of Icheon.

See also
List of mountains in Korea

Notes

References

Mountains of South Korea
Mountains of Gyeonggi Province